Life Teen is a Catholic youth ministry organization in the United States.  Life Teen’s mission statement explains, "As a Eucharist-centered movement within the Roman Catholic Church, Life Teen leads teenagers and their families into a deeper relationship with Jesus Christ and His Church".

Life Teen provides parish-based programs. The Life Teen program for high-school teenagers is used by over 1,800 Catholic parishes in 31 countries. In 2003, they launched the Edge program for middle-school pupils, which is now used by almost 1,000 parishes in 10 countries. As of 2005, over 100,000 high-school-aged Catholics in the US attend Life Teen each week.

History
Life Teen was established in 1985 at St. Timothy's Parish in Mesa, Arizona. The founder and then-priest Dale Fushek said he believed the Church needed a new approach to evangelize Christ to the Catholic youth in the area. Fushek was later excommunicated when he opened a non-denominational, Protestant-oriented worship center in the Phoenix area; he was then embroiled in allegations he sexually abused teenage boys and young men; he was ultimately laicized by the Church.

Though Life Teen is present in fewer than 10% of American parishes, more than 40% of American seminarians had some connection to the program during their teenage years.

Organization
Life Teen is headed by a five-member administrative team including President and CEO Randy Raus, Executive Vice President and Chief Information Officer Mark Hart, Vice President of Ministry Advancement Steve Allgeyer, Vice President of Parish Services Joel Stepanek, and Vice President of Missions and Operations Jason Ball.  Its 23-member board of directors includes Bishop Everard De Jong, Bishop James Wall, four priests, and several laities from around the country.

Ministry model

Life Teen helps Youth Ministers and adult program leaders, known as Core members, minister to young Catholics in a parish setting. Teenagers typically attend a Sunday Mass specifically intended for their families and other interested parishioners. Music and homilies are focused on teenagers, who are invited to be trained in approved liturgical roles such as lectors, ushers, altar servers, greeters, and Extraordinary ministers of Holy Communion.  Following Mass, a "Life Night", which incorporates teaching in Catholic beliefs, interactive activities, and socialization, is held.

Many Life Teen Programs hold events such as Bible study and other social events. Life Teen and Edge programs are encouraged to host two weekend-long retreats for members throughout the year.

Mass
Life Teen holds youth-focused masses, which it says are the most important part of its program. Particular efforts are made to create a welcoming atmosphere, reverent and relevant music, and an engaging homily that speaks to the issues in teens' lives. The music ranges from traditional Catholic hymns, sometimes with a modern arrangement, to Catholic worship songs. Life Teen has a transcription of a video talk by Fr. Robert Schreiner explaining the role of music within Liturgy.

Life Nights
Following the Mass are gatherings that are aimed to be enjoyable and to challenge teenagers to deepen their relationships with God and to learn about the Catholic faith.   Known as Life Nights, the gatherings consist of four segments;  Gather, Proclaim, Break, and Send, which are derived from the flow of the Mass.

Life Nights consist of catechetical, issue, and social nights.  Catechetical nights are designed to teach teenagers about aspects of the Catholic faith, ssue nights deal with real-life issues such as gossip, chastity, and drinking and social nights are designed to help teenagers build friendships and strengthen social bonds.

Core values
Life Teen promotes seven core values.
Eucharistic spirituality - focuses on  the Mass and receiving Christ in the Eucharist.
 Love - Life Teen strives to show attendees of the Mass or a program offered that they are loved.
 Joy  - according to Life Teen; "Jesus is a reason to be joyful and excited about life".
 Affirmation - As a community, participants in Life Teen are expected to support and encourage one another.
 Authenticity -  Life Teen encourages teenagers to live an authentic life in which they do not wear a "mask" or pretend to be someone they are not.  
 Evangelization -  Life Teen believes "every teenager deserves a chance to have a relationship with Jesus" and invites all to participate.
 Primary vocation - The adult leaders of Life Teen are called to take care of their primary responsibilities ahead of their commitments to Life Teen or any other purpose.

Additional programs
In addition to high school youth ministry, Life Teen has been expanded to other areas of ministry.  It offers training events, summer camps, youth rallies, and conferences.

Summer camps
Life Teen operates summer camps at Camp Hidden Lake in Dahlonega, Georgia, and Camp Covecrest in Tiger, Georgia.  The camps are designed to build friendships, allow attendees to have fun, and deepen their faith through prayer and experiencing the sacraments.

Camp activities include games and outdoor activities.

The camps also encourage and assist teens to develop a deeper relationship with Christ. In addition to the Mass, attendees can partake in the sacrament of Reconciliation, listen to speakers, and praise and worship music, and attend Eucharistic adoration.

St. John Paul II Center for the New Evangelization

In 2012, Bishop Pierre-André Dumas asked Life Teen to build a base on diocesan land in Madian, Haiti. He tasked Life Teen with bringing Catholic youth ministry to the Diocese of Anse-à-Veau et Miragoâne. The base currently serves teenagers in the area through Bible studies, Life Nights, and discipleship. The base brings together both Haitian and American missionaries.

See also

Catholic spirituality
Fellowship of Catholic University Students
Universal call to holiness
Vocational Discernment in the Catholic Church
World Youth Day

References

External links
Official Life Teen website
CatholicYouthMinistry.com - for Adult Leaders of CatholicYouthMinistry.com - powered by Life Teen
EdgeYouthMinistry.com

Catholic lay organisations
Catholic youth organizations
Organizations based in Mesa, Arizona
Youth organizations established in 1985
Catholic Church in Arizona
Youth organizations based in the United States
1985 establishments in Arizona